Serbian diaspora refers to Serbian emigrant communities in the diaspora. The existence of a numerous diaspora of Serbian nationals is mainly a consequence of either economic or political (coercion or expulsion) reasons.

There were different waves of Serbian migration, characterized into:
Economic emigration (end of 19th–beginning of 20th c.)
Political emigration (from 1945 up to 1967) of anti-Communist regime members, better known as the Chetnik Immigration
Economic emigration (1967 up to the 1980s) of mostly labourers with mid-level education or professionals of higher education
Political emigration (1990s) refugees of the Yugoslav Wars.

The main countries of destination were Germany, Austria, United States, Sweden, Canada and Australia. Based on a 2007 estimate, there were 4.2 to 5.8 million Serbians or people of Serbian origin in the diaspora. The Ministry of Diaspora (MoD) estimated in 2008 that the Serbian diaspora numbered 3,908,000 to 4,170,000, the numbers including not only Serbian citizens but people who view Serbia as their nation-state regardless of the citizenship they hold; these could include second- and third-generation Serbian emigrants or descendants of emigrants from other former Yugoslav republics who never obtained Serbian citizenship but are ethnic Serbs. By continent or region, it was estimated that 2,705,000–2,765,000 lived in Europe (excluding former Yugoslavia), 1–1,2 million in North America, 130,000 in Australia, 26,000 in Africa, 20,000 in Central and South America, 8,000 in Asia, 5,000–7,000 in New Zealand, 5,000 in the Middle East. There were  1,000 diaspora associations, registered in 191 countries.

In 2014 it was estimated based on diplomatic-consular posts that the Serbian diaspora numbered 5.1 million in about 100 states. The term "Serbs in the region" is used for ethnic Serbs of Slovenia, Croatia, Bosnia and Herzegovina, Montenegro, North Macedonia, Romania, Albania, Kosovo and Hungary, estimated to number 2,120,000. The latter group may or may not be included in estimates.

Serbian diaspora by countries

Europe

Elsewhere

Serbian diaspora by cities
 
Chicago 300,000 
Vienna 163,483 (2017)
Los Angeles 50,000 (2018)
Toronto (Greater, ie Census Metropolitan Area) 33,055 (2016)
Sydney 28,307 (2001)
Berlin 27,536 (2014)
Paris 27,373 (2011)
Munich 26,976 (2017)
Prague 25,255 (2015)
 Vancouver 12,895 (2016)
Hamburg 9,539 (2016)
Frankfurt am Main 9,404 (2019)
Brisbane 7,218 (Australian Bureau of Statistics, Census)(2011)
Timișoara 6,311 (2002)
Trieste 4,501 (2017)
London 4,316 (2011)
Helsinki 2,840 (2017)
Vicenza 2,609 (2017)
Linz 2,012 (2017)
Budapest 1,861 (2011)
Graz 1,641 (2017)
Niagara Falls 1,500 (2016)
Innsbruck 1,552 (2017)
Moscow 1,195 (2010)
Vantaa 923 (2017)
Rome 731 (2017)
Naples 646 (2017)
Espoo 645 (2017)
Arzignano 504 (2017)
Milan 493 (2017)
Turku 432 (2017)
Turin 216 (2017)

See also
Serb diaspora
List of diplomatic missions of Serbia

Annotations

References

Sources

External links

Serbian diaspora organizations
Serbian World Congress
Serbian Unity Congress
Serbian National Defense Council of America 
Serbian Council of Great Britain 
Serbian Cultural Association Oplenac, Toronto Canada
Other
USA SERBS, Serbian-American Network
Srbi u svetu Jedinstvena baza podataka o Srbima i srpskim organizacijama širom sveta
Serb World USA
Serbs in South America
Serbs in Arizona
Serbs in Los Angeles
Serbs in the Netherlands

 
European diasporas